Dagoll Dagom is a Catalan theatre company founded in 1974, mostly dedicated to musical theater. They have performed around 5,000 times in Europe and South America. Dagoll Dagom have also created television series and released soundtrack albums. In 2015 they received the Joan Coromines Prize.

Works

Theatre
 Yo era un tonto y lo que he visto me ha hecho dos tontos (1974)
 Nocturn per acordió (1975)
 No hablaré en clase (1977)
 Antaviana (1978), based on Pere Calders 's tales
 Nit de Sant Joan (1981), with music by Jaume Sisa
 Glups! (1983), based on Gerard Lauzier's comics
 Antaviana (1985), revival
 El Mikado (1986), (The Mikado), by Gilbert and Sullivan
 Quarteto da cinque (1987)
 Mar i Cel (1988), based on the homonymous work by Àngel Guimerà.
 Flor de nit (1992), written by Manuel Vázquez-Montalbán
 Historietes (1993), a revival of the previous plays
 T'odio amor meu (1995), based on Dorothy Parker's stories and with Cole Porter's songs.
 Pigmalió (1997), (Pygmalion), by George Bernard Shaw
 Els Pirates (1997), (The Pirates of Penzance), by Gilbert and Sullivan
 Cacao (2000)
 Poe (2002), based on Edgar Allan Poe's tales.
 La Perritxola (2003), (La Périchole), by Jaques Offenbach
 Mar i Cel (2004), revival
 El Mikado (2005), revival
 Boscos endins (2007-2008), (Into the Woods), by Stephen Sondheim.
 Aloma (2008-2009), based on the homonymous work by Catalan writer Mercè Rodoreda.
 Nit de Sant Joan (2010-2011), revival
 Cop de Rock (2011), which includes some of the best-known Rock català songs.
 La família irreal (2012-2013), a parody of the spanish monarchy 
 Super 3, el musical (2013), based on homonymus the childish tv program 
 Mar i Cel (2014-2015), revival
 Scaramouche (2016-2017), based on the homonymous movie
Maremar (2018)

Television
 Oh! Europa (1993)
 Oh! Espanya (1996)
 Psico-Express (2001)
 La memòria dels cargols (2005-2006)
 La Sagrada Família (2010)

External links
Dagoll Dagom official website

References

Theatre companies in Catalonia
Música Global artists